Military of Korea could refer to:

Military of North Korea, known as the Korean People's Army
Military of South Korea, the armed forces of Republic of Korea
Military history of Korea, the military history of Korean civilization